Ruddalens IP  is a sports venue in Västra Frölunda, Gothenburg, Sweden.

It houses a football stadium for the teams Västra Frölunda IF, Utsiktens BK, Assyriska BK and BK Skottfint with a total capacity of 5,000 spectators.

The speed skating venue Rudhallen is the only of its kind in Sweden with the entire facility under one roof. It was the venue for the 2003 World Allround Speed Skating Championships. The indoor speed skating venue is closed for the season 2019/20. 

Ruddalens IP also has an outdoor bandy field.

References 

Football venues in Gothenburg
Sport in Gothenburg
Speed skating venues
Speed skating venues in Sweden